Khadis Ibragimov (born May 21, 1995) is a Russian mixed martial artist and sambo practitioner. A professional competitor since 2017, he has also formerly competed  for Ultimate Fighting Championship and M-1 Global where he was the Light heavyweight Champion. Twice European Combat Sambo champion.

Mixed martial arts career

M-1 Global 
Ibragimov was the formal M-1 Global light heavyweight champion (twice), winning over Dmitriy Mikutsa and Rafał Kijańczuk.

Ultimate Fighting Championship
Ibragimov made his UFC debut against fellow newcomer Jung Da Un on August 31, 2019. He lost the fight via standing guillotine in the third round.

Ibragimov next made a short notice replacement against Ed Herman. He lost the fight via unanimous decision.

A bout between Ibragimov and Roman Dolidze was initially scheduled for the promotion's inaugural event in Kazakhstan planned a month prior. However, the fight was postponed after the card was moved to Las Vegas due to travel restrictions for both participants related to the COVID-19 pandemic. The pairing was left intact and eventually took place on July 19, 2020 at UFC Fight Night: Figueiredo vs. Benavidez 2. Ibragimov lost the fight via technical knockout in round one.

Ibragimov faced promotional newcomer Danilo Marques on September 27, 2020 at UFC 253. He lost the fight via unanimous decision.

On October 2, 2020 it was reported Ibragimov was released by UFC.

Championships and accomplishments

Mixed martial arts
Hardcore Fighting Championship 
HFC Heavyweight Championship (One time, one defense) 
M-1 Global
M-1 Global Light Heavyweight Champion (Two times)

Combat Sambo
2016 European Championships - 1st (90kg, Kazan)
2019 European Championships - 1st (100kg, Gijón)

Mixed martial arts record

|-
|Win
|align=center|13–4
|Abdulbasir Vagabov
|Technical Submission (guillotine choke)
|Hardcore FC 38
|
|align=center|2
|align=center|0:34
|Moscow, Russia
|
|-
|Win
|align=center|12–4
|Khusein Adamov
|Decision (unanimous)
|Hardcore FC 17
|
|align=center|5
|align=center|5:00
|Moscow, Russia
|
|-
|Win
|align=center|11–4
|Denis Polekhin
|KO (punch)
|Hardcore FC 14
|
|align=center|1
|align=center|0:09
|Moscow, Russia
|
|-
|Win
|align=center|10–4
|Dmitriy Andryushko
|TKO (punches)
|Hardcore FC 11
|
|align=center|1
|align=center|3:50
|Moscow, Russia
|
|-
|Win
|align=center|9–4
|Islam Zhangorazov
|KO (punches)
|Hardcore FC 7
|
|align=center|1
|align=center|3:20
|Moscow, Russia
|
|-
|Loss
|align=center|8–4
|Danilo Marques
|Decision (unanimous)
|UFC 253
|
|align=center|3
|align=center|5:00
|Abu Dhabi, United Arab Emirates
|
|-
|Loss
|align=center|8–3
|Roman Dolidze
|TKO (knee and punches)
|UFC Fight Night: Figueiredo vs. Benavidez 2
|
|align=center|1
|align=center|4:15
|Abu Dhabi, United Arab Emirates
|
|-
|Loss
|align=center|8–2
|Ed Herman
|Decision (unanimous)
|UFC Fight Night: Magomedsharipov vs. Kattar
|
|align=center|3
|align=center|5:00
|Moscow, Russia
|
|-
|Loss
|align=center|8–1
|Da Un Jung
|Submission (guillotine choke)
|UFC Fight Night: Andrade vs. Zhang
|
|align=center|3
|align=center|2:00
|Shenzhen, China
|
|-
|Win
|align=center|8–0
|Rafał Kijańczuk
|TKO (punches)
|M-1 Challenge 101
|
|align=center|1
|align=center|2:30
|Almaty, Kazakhstan
|
|-
|Win
|align=center|7–0
|Dmitriy Mikutsa
|Submission (rear-naked choke)
|M-1 Challenge 96
|
|align=center|2
|align=center|4:30
|Saint Petersburg, Russia
|
|-
|Win
|align=center|6–0
|Giga Kukhalashvili
|DQ (rope grabbing)
|M-1 Challenge 92
|
|align=center|3
|align=center|3:27
|Saint Petersburg, Russia
|
|-
|Win
|align=center|5–0
|Stephan Puetz
|Submission (bulldog choke)
|M-1 Challenge 88
|
|align=center|3
|align=center|2:12
|Moscow, Russia
|
|-
|Win
|align=center|4–0
|Ullubiy Pakhrutdinov
|Submission (rear-naked choke)
|L-1: Road To China 3
|
|align=center|1
|align=center|1:33
|Saint Petersburg, Russia
|
|-
|Win
|align=center|3–0
|Dmitriy Shumilov
|Decision (unanimous)
|Friendship of Peoples Grand Prix 2017
|
|align=center|2
|align=center|5:00
|Saint Petersburg, Russia
|
|-
|Win
|align=center|2–0
|Vladimir Trusov
|Decision (unanimous)
|Friendship of Peoples Grand Prix 2017
|
|align=center|2
|align=center|5:00
|Saint Petersburg, Russia
|
|-
|Win
|align=center|1–0
|Mukhammedali Shokirov
|TKO
|Russia Regionals
|
|align=center|1
|align=center|1:23
|Saint Petersburg, Russia
|

See also 
 List of male mixed martial artists

References

External links 
  
  

1995 births
Living people
Light heavyweight mixed martial artists
People from Shamilsky District
Dagestani mixed martial artists
Russian male mixed martial artists
Mixed martial artists utilizing sambo
Ultimate Fighting Championship male fighters
Russian sambo practitioners